Events in the year 2006 in Gabon.

Incumbents 

 President: Omar Bongo Ondimba
 Prime Minister: Jean-François Ntoutoume Emane (until 20 January), Jean Eyeghé Ndong (from 20 January)

Events 

 17 December – Parliamentary elections were held in the country.

Deaths

References 

 
2000s in Gabon
Years of the 21st century in Gabon
Gabon